Nabil Kouki (born 9 March 1970), is a Tunisian football coach and former footballer. He is currently the coach of CR Belouizdad. He started his professional football career in 1990, at Olympique Béja where he played for five seasons before moving to the Club Africain where he also played for five seasons.

Club career
Kouki started his professional football career in 1990, at Olympique Béja where he played for five seasons before moving to the Club Africain where he also played for five seasons.

Coaching career
After his playing career, he became assistant coach and first coach since 2011 at Sfaxien, Stade Tunisien and Club Africain, also he coaches various clubs including Al-Hilal with whom he finished semi-finalist of the CAF Champions League . For family reasons, he chose in October 2015 to return to Tunisia, where he recovers his position as coach of Club Africain.

On 9 October 2017, he agreed with Al-Ramtha to become the head coach of the team.

On 5 June 2018, he became the coach of the Jordanian team Al-Faisaly.

In 2019, he signed a contract ES Sétif.
In 2022, he signed a contract CR Belouizdad.

Honours

As Player
Tunisian Ligue Professionnelle 1: 1995–1996
Tunisian Cup: 1992-1993, 1997-1998, 1999-2000
Tunisian Super Cup: 1995
Arab Club Championship: 1997
Arab Cup Winners' Cup: 1995

As Manager
North African Cup of Champions: 2008
Tunisian Ligue Professionnelle 1: 2008
CAF Confederation Cup: 2010 (Runner-up)

References

External links

1970 births
Living people
Footballers from Tunis
Tunisian footballers
Olympique Béja players
Club Africain players
Tunisian Ligue Professionnelle 1 players
CS Sfaxien managers
Stade Tunisien managers
Club Athlétique Bizertin managers
Al-Ittihad Tripoli managers
Al-Hilal Club (Omdurman) managers
Al-Faisaly SC managers
Al-Muharraq SC managers
Club Africain football managers
Expatriate football managers in Jordan
Expatriate football managers in Sudan
Expatriate football managers in Libya
Expatriate football managers in Algeria
Tunisian expatriate sportspeople in Sudan
Tunisian expatriates in Libya
Association football midfielders
Tunisian football managers
Tunisian expatriate football managers
Al-Ramtha SC managers